William Mills (28 January 1915 – 1991) was a professional footballer, who played for Aberdeen, Huddersfield Town, Dumbarton and Clyde. He was born in Alexandria, West Dunbartonshire, Scotland.

Playing career
Mills was signed by Aberdeen from Junior club Bridgeton Waverley in 1932. He entered their first team almost immediately, aged 17. Mills was primarily a creative player, but also scored frequently and was the club's top goalscorer in the 1933–34 season.

He was transferred to Huddersfield Town in March 1938 for £6,500. Mills did not stay long in English football, however, as the Second World War curtailed league play. After the war concluded he played in the Highland Football League for Lossiemouth and Huntly.

International
Mills represented Scotland three times between October 1935 and December 1936.

Personal life
His brother Hugh 'Bunty' Mills was also a footballer, who began his career at Bridgeton and featured for West Ham.

Career statistics

Club 

* Unofficial wartime appearances

International

References

Sources

External links
Profile and stats at AFC Heritage Trust

1915 births
1991 deaths
Scottish footballers
Association football inside forwards
English Football League players
Scottish Football League players
Scottish Junior Football Association players
Aberdeen F.C. players
Huddersfield Town A.F.C. players
Clyde F.C. players
Bridgeton Waverley F.C. players
Dumbarton F.C. wartime guest players
People from Alexandria, West Dunbartonshire
Footballers from West Dunbartonshire
Scotland international footballers
Huntly F.C. players
Lossiemouth F.C. players
Date of death missing
Highland Football League players